FXML is an XML-based user interface markup language created by Oracle Corporation for defining the user interface of a JavaFX application.
FXML presents an alternative to designing user interfaces using procedural code, and allows for abstracting program design from program logic.

<?import javafx.scene.control.Label?>
<Label text="Hello, World!"/>

See also
 Comparison of user interface markup languages

References

External links
 FXML tutorial
 Introduction to FXML

Java (programming language)
Declarative markup languages
Declarative programming languages
XML markup languages
User interface markup languages
Vector graphics markup languages
XML-based standards